The City of Maryborough was a local government area about  northwest of Melbourne, the state capital of Victoria, Australia, and the governing body for the regional centre of Maryborough. The City of Maryborough was surrounded by the Shire of Tullaroop, which was united with Maryborough under the Shire of Central Goldfields, as part of a large-scale statewide amalgamation program by the Victorian Government in 1994–95.

History

Maryborough was first incorporated as a borough on 31 March 1857, and became a city on 31 March 1961.

On 20 January 1995, the City of Maryborough was abolished, and along with the Shires of Bet Bet, Tullaroop and surrounding districts, was merged into the newly created Shire of Central Goldfields.

Wards

The City of Maryborough was divided into three wards in 1887, each of which elected three councillors:
 North Ward
 South Ward
 East Ward

Population

* Estimate in the 1958 Victorian Year Book.

References

External links
 Victorian Places - Maryborough

Maryborough
1857 establishments in Australia
Maryborough, Victoria